Yamada Line may refer to either of the following railway lines in Japan:
 Yamada Line (JR East), a railway line in Iwate Prefecture, connecting Morioka and Miyako
 Yamada Line (Kintetsu), a railway line in Mie Prefecture, connecting Matsusaka and Ise